Coccymys shawmayeri is a rodent in the family of Muridae native to New Guinea. The species was described in 2009.

References
 ;  2009. Systematic Reviews of New Guinea Coccymys and “Melomys” albidens (Muridae, Murinae) with Descriptions of New Taxa. Bulletin of the American Museum of Natural History 329: 1–139.

Coccymys
Mammals described in 2009